Ray Hood (born in Alabama) is an American country music singer-songwriter. Hood co-wrote Doug Stone's 1994 top five single "Addicted to a Dollar." Between 1996 and 2000, Hood charted two singles on the Billboard Hot Country Singles & Tracks chart. The highest-charting of the two, "Critical List," peaked at number 67 in 2000. It received a favorable review from Deborah Evans Price of Billboard, who wrote that "Hood has an impressive, barroom-seasoned baritone that works effectively on this uptempo number." The follow-up single, "What's a Little More Water," also received a positive review from Price, who said that "all the elements are here–a stunning traditional country vocal, clean and crisp production, and a killer hook."

His eponymous second album, released by Caption Records in October 2000, received a favorable review from Ray Waddell of Billboard, who wrote that "it's not often an artist comes along who can ease from heart-wrenching country ballads to gritty machismo so effortlessly and convincingly" and called the album "one of the most complete, solid country packages to come out of Nashville this year." The album received a negative review from Tom Netherland of Country Standard Time, who said that "despite a strong baritone and Nashville's leading session men backing his dozen tracks, Hood simply veers too from the country fold."

Discography

Albums

Singles

Music videos

References

American country singer-songwriters
American male singer-songwriters
Living people
Country musicians from Alabama
Curb Records artists
Year of birth missing (living people)
Singer-songwriters from Alabama